Noddies could refer to:

 Noddy (tern)
 Noddy (TV interview technique)
 Velocette LE riding British Police motorcyclists

See also

 Noddy (disambiguation)
 Nods (disambiguation)
 NOD (disambiguation)